A Tiger Dancing is the third album by the hip hop group Heiruspecs.  It was released on September 28, 2004.

The Song "5ves" appeared on the Harold & Kumar Go to White Castle soundtrack.

Track listing
All tracks by Heiruspecs

"Something for Nothing"  – 3:57
"Intro"  – 1:19
"Two-Fold"  – 4:13
"Dollar"  – 3:08
"5ves"  – 4:35
"A Tiger Dancing"  – 2:28
"32 Months"  – 2:05
"Swearsong"  – 2:29
"I'm Behind You"  – 3:49
"Fist"  – 3:45
"Get Down"  – 4:42
"It Takes"  – 3:13
"Heartsprings"  – 3:19
"Marching Orders"  – 3:46
"Position of Strength"  – 3:55
"Lie to Me"  – 2:54
"Shout Outs"  – 4:51

Personnel 
 Felix – Vocals
 Heiruspecs – Mixing
 Twinkie Jiggles – Bass
 Peter Leggett – Drums
 MuadDib – Vocals, Beatbox
 Josh Peterson – Guitar
 DeVon "dVRG" Gray - keyboards

References

2004 albums
Heiruspecs albums
Razor & Tie albums